Zhilino is a rural locality (a village) in Spasskoye Rural Settlement, Vologodsky District, Vologda Oblast, Russia. The population was 1 as of 2002. There are 14 streets.

Geography 
Zhilino is located 14 km southwest of Vologda (the district's administrative centre) by road. Tropino is the nearest rural locality.

References 

Rural localities in Vologodsky District